Kirk Netherton (born ), also known by the nickname of "Nevo", is an English rugby league footballer who currently plays for the Featherstone Rovers.

Career
Kirk formerly played for Hull Kingston Rovers, and made his Super League début against Catalans Dragons Easter Monday 2007 season. He re-signed for another year at The Jungle to play for Castleford Tigers (Heritage № 898) in 2010. In 2010 he joined Widnes Vikings for one month in 2010 which then was made permanent after the one month. He joined Featherstone for the 2011 season and went on to win the Championship Grand Final beating Sheffield Eagles 40–4.

References

External links
Castleford Tigers profile

1985 births
Living people
Castleford Tigers players
English rugby league players
Featherstone Rovers players
Hull Kingston Rovers players
Rugby league hookers
Rugby league players from Kingston upon Hull
Widnes Vikings players